Thunder, Lightning and Sunshine (German: Donner, Blitz und Sonnenschein) is a 1936 German comedy film directed by Erich Engels and starring Karl Valentin, Liesl Karlstadt and Ilse Petri. The film's sets were designed by the art directors Paul Markwitz and Heinrich Richter. It was shot at Terra Film's Marienfelde Studios in Berlin.

Cast
Karl Valentin as Sebastian Huckebein, Master tailor
Liesl Karlstadt as Barbara, his wife
Ilse Petri as Evi, their daughter
Reinhold Bernt as Franzl, Journeyman tailor
Hans Leibelt as Jacob Greizinger
Volker von Collande as Andreas, his son
Albert Florath as Paul Huberding, Gastwirt
Käthe Haack as Wally, his wife
Käte Merk as Rosa, their niece
Aribert Wäscher as Georg Sonnweber, dancing master
Gerhard Bienert as engineer Poppe
Martha Ziegler as Moni, Greizinger's economist
Lucie Euler
Hanni Weisse
Rose Vollborn
Gerti Ober
Klaus Pohl
Hanns Waschatko
Hans Halden as Commissioner
Karl Junge-Swinburne
Walter Doerry
Hans Weidecker and Sylvia Prillinger as dance couple 
Else Wunsch

References

External links

1936 comedy films
German comedy films
Films of Nazi Germany
Films directed by Erich Engels
German black-and-white films
Terra Film films
1930s German films
Films shot at Terra Studios